Good Shepherd School may refer to:

Good Shepherd International School, Ooty, India
Good Shepherd Cathedral School, Philippines
Good Shepherd School, Grahamstown, South Africa
Good Shepherd Lutheran School, California, US

See also